Dynastopus is a genus of mites in the family Acaridae.

Species
 Dynastopus camerikae Fain, 1978
 Dynastopus augosomae Fain, 1978
 Dynastopus tshuapensis Fain, 1978

References

Acaridae